The Macarthur Wind Farm is a wind farm located in Macarthur, Victoria, Australia, near Hamilton, 260 km west of Melbourne. It is on a 5,500 ha site which has an installed capacity of 420 megawatts (MW). Based on a capacity factor of around 35%, it is estimated that the long-term average generation will be approximately 1,250 GWh per year. Its actual capacity factor is much lower, with a historical average of 26.29% since 2013.

It is the largest wind farm in the southern hemisphere generating enough power for 220,000 homes and abating 1.7 million tons of greenhouse gases annually, at a capacity factor of 35%. The wind farm comprises 140 Vestas V112-3.0MW wind turbines manufactured in Denmark.

The project cost about A$1 billion and was fully operational in January 2013. It was constructed by Vestas and Leighton Contractors. The first turbines were connected to the grid in September 2012. AGL also invested an additional $27m in the substation, which is completely owned by the company.

History
The project was proposed in 2004 and approved by the Victorian government in October 2006.

The project was developed by a joint venture formed by AGL Energy and Meridian Energy, a New Zealand-based power generating company, with works starting in 2010. The project was fully operational in January 2013.

In 2013, Meridian sold its 50% share in the wind farm to Malaysian power company Malakoff Corporation Berhad for A$650 million. In September 2015, AGL Energy sold its 50% stake in the wind farm to H. R. L. Morrison & Co for $532m.

AGL Energy will operate and maintain the wind farm in place of Morrison & Co and Malakoff. It also reserves the rights to all renewable energy certificates and electricity production until 2038.

Operations 
The wind farm registered its first grid output in September 2012 and reached full output in March 2013. The generation table uses eljmkt nemlog to obtain generation values for each month. The URL must be formatted as: "http://nemlog.com.au/show/unit/YYYYMMDD/YYYYMMDD/?k1=GENCODE" Macarthur's code is MACARTH1, so that is used.

Note: Asterisk indicates power output was limited during the month.

Performance 
Macarthur has consistently been one of the worst performing wind farms since its construction in 2012. It was intended to have a capacity factor around 34% and generate 1240 GWh of energy per annum. 

However, the most the farm has generated was 1081 GWh in 2013, and has consistently averaged around 994 GWh, which corresponds to a capacity factor of 27%.

See also

 List of wind farms in Victoria
 Wind power in Australia

References

External links
 Macarthur Wind Farm - AGL website
 

Wind farms in Victoria (Australia)